The list contains the largest contiguous public parks-preserves within  of either Baltimore, Maryland or Washington, D.C., which is within the Baltimore–Washington metropolitan area.

Prince William Forest - Locust Shade, Virginia;  — about one-third is closed to the public
Patuxent Wildlife Research Refuge -  Fran Uhler (Patuxent River Park), Maryland;  — about one-third is closed to the public
Seneca Creek - McKee-Beshers - C & O Canal - Germantown, Maryland / Algonkian, Virginia; 
Upper Patapsco, Maryland; 
Patuxent River Park - Merkle - Jug Bay Wetlands - House Creek, Maryland; 
Mason Neck - Accotink Bay - Pohick - Meadowwood - Gunston, Virginia; 
Patuxent River State Park, Maryland; 
Chapmans - Myrtle Grove - Mattawoman, Maryland; 
Sugarloaf Mountain - Monocacy River - C & O Canal, Maryland; 
Lower Gunpowder Falls, Maryland; 
Manassas Battlefield, Virginia; 
Little Bennett, Maryland; 
Great Falls, Virginia - C & O Canal, Maryland - Riverbend, Virginia - Scott's Run, Virginia - Carderock, Maryland; 
Lower Patapsco - Rockburn Branch, Maryland; 
Cedarville, Maryland;  
Smithsonian Environmental Research Center Maryland;  - limited public access
Upper Gunpowder Falls (Hereford), Maryland; 
Rock Creek Regional (Lake Needwood - North Branch); 
Susquehanna State Park, Maryland; 
Fountainhead, Virginia; 
Nanjemoy Creek, Maryland;  - generally closed to the public
Mid-Gunpowder Falls (Baldwin-Fork), Maryland; 
Eastern Neck, Maryland; 
Douglas Point - Mallows Bay - Purse State Park (Nanjemoy Wildlife Area), Maryland; 
Soldiers Delight, Maryland; 
Rock Creek Park, D.C.;

Notes

 - only a portion of this park is publicly accessible
 - This list does not include interrupted, scattered parts of administrative units, but rather entire, contiguous park-preserve tracts. Strip park area (<1000 foot (300 m) width for more than 1/2 mile (800 m)) and public utility land (reservoirs) are excluded. Much of the  Aberdeen Proving Grounds, Maryland. and  Quantico Marine Base, Virginia are undeveloped, and constitute the largest such areas within  of either Baltimore or Washington. Neither is generally open to the public. Quantico is contiguous with Prince William Forest Park.

References

External links
 The Nature Conservancy - Maryland/DC Areas We Protect

Prince William Forest Park
Locust Shade Park
Patuxent Wildlife Research Refuge
Fran Uhler Natural Area
Seneca Creek State Park
McKee Beshers Wildlife Area
Chesapeake and Ohio Canal 
South Germantown Park
Algonkian Park
Patapsco Valley State Park
Patuxent River Park
Merkle Wildlife Sanctuary
Jug Bay Wetlands Sanctuary
Mason Neck
Pohick Bay Park
Gunston Hall
Meadowood Recreation Area
Patuxent River State Park
Sugarloaf Mountain
Monocacy Wildlife Area
Gunpowder Falls State Park
Chapman Forest (molehill.us)
Chapman Forest (maryland.gov)
Myrtle Grove Wildlife Area
Mattawoman Natural Area
Manassas Battlefield 
Little Bennett Regional Park
Great Falls Park, Va.
Riverbend Park
Scotts Run Preserve
Carderock Recreation Area
Rockburn Branch Park
Cedarville State Forest
Smithsonian Environmental Research Center
Rock Creek Regional Park, Md.
Susquehanna State Park
Fountainhead Park
 North Branch Park
Nanjemoy Creek Preserve
 Eastern Neck Wildlife Refuge
 Douglas Point/Nanjemoy Wildlife Area (blm.gov)
Douglas Point/Nanjemoy Wildlife Area (state.md.us)
Purse State Park
Soldiers Delight Natural Area
Rock Creek Park, D.C.
Aberdeen Proving Grounds
Quantico Marine Base

Parks
Lists of forests in the United States
Lists of parks in the United States by city

List of parks in the Baltimore-Washington
Baltimore-related lists
Washington, D.C.-related lists